is a passenger railway station located in the city of Hino, Tokyo, Japan, operated by East Japan Railway Company (JR East).

Lines
The station is 43.1 kilometers from Tokyo Station.

Station layout
The station consists of two island platforms serving four tracks with the platforms connected by a footbridge. The station is staffed.

Platforms

History
Toyoda Station opened on 22 February 1901. With the privatization of Japanese National Railways (JNR) on 1 April 1987, the station came under the control of JR East.

Passenger statistics
In fiscal 2019, the station was used by an average of 35,718 passengers daily (boarding passengers only).

The passenger figures for previous years are as shown below.

See also

 List of railway stations in Japan

References

External links

 JR East station information 

Chūō Main Line
Stations of East Japan Railway Company
Railway stations in Tokyo
Railway stations in Japan opened in 1901
Hino, Tokyo